This article describes aspects of poetry in the 3rd century B.C.

Mediterranean World

Poets (by date of birth)
 Apollonius of Rhodes (c. 295 - after 246 BCE), Greek
 Ennius (239 - 169 BCE), Salento, Latin

Date unknown:
 Herodas, Greek
 Theocritus, Greek
 Anyte of Tegea, Greek woman poet

Works
 Likely date for the Book of Job, written in Hebrew
  Aetia by Callimachus

China

Poets (by date of birth)
 Song Yu

Works
 Chu Ci, the second great anthology of early Chinese poetry

References

Poetry by century
Poetry